Mustapha Harram (born 29 April 1981), is a Belgian futsal player who plays for Gelko Hasselt and the Belgian national futsal team.

References

External links
UEFA profile

1981 births
Living people
Belgian men's futsal players